Let us with a gladsome mind is a hymn written in 1623 by John Milton, a pupil at St. Paul's School, at the age of 15 as a paraphrase of Psalm 136. It was set to music as the hymn tune known as Monkland by the organist John Bernard Wilkes using a melody written by John Antes.

Lyrics

References

English Christian hymns
17th-century hymns